Patricia García (born 18 January 1957) is a Mexican gymnast. She competed at the 1972 Summer Olympics and the 1976 Summer Olympics.

References

1957 births
Living people
Mexican female artistic gymnasts
Olympic gymnasts of Mexico
Gymnasts at the 1972 Summer Olympics
Gymnasts at the 1976 Summer Olympics
Place of birth missing (living people)
Pan American Games medalists in gymnastics
Pan American Games bronze medalists for Mexico
Gymnasts at the 1979 Pan American Games
20th-century Mexican women
21st-century Mexican women